Bayingolin (often abbreviated to Bayingol; also as Bayinguoleng) is an autonomous prefecture for Mongol people in the southeast of Xinjiang Uyghur Autonomous Region, Western China. It borders Gansu to the east, Qinghai to the southeast and the Tibet Autonomous Region to the south. The prefectural capital is Korla.

History 
In a 2017 announcement from officials in Bayingolin Mongol Autonomous Prefecture, it was proclaimed that "there is a severe threat from international terrorism, and cars have been used as a key means of transport for terrorists as well as constantly serving as weapons. It is therefore necessary to monitor and track all vehicles in the prefecture."

Demographics 
According to the 2000 census, Bayingolin has 1,056,970 inhabitants (population density: 2.28 per km2).

As of 2015, 826,063 of the 1,393,812 residents of the county were Han Chinese, 440,283 were Uyghur, 64,979 were Hui and 50,091 were Mongol.

Ethnic groups in Bayingolin 
When Bayingolin was established in 1954, Mongols comprised 35% of the prefecture's population. Due to development needs and migration, the Han population increased from 1,682 in the region of Bayingolin in 1947 to over 660,000 in 2004.

Population by ethnicity

Subdivisions 
Bayin'gholin directly controls one county-level city, seven counties and one Hui autonomous county.

Notable persons 
 Mihrigul Tursun

See also 

 Lop Nur
 Torghut

References

External links 

 Government website of Bayin'gholin (in Simplified Chinese)
 Government website of Bayin'gholin (in Mongolian)
 Government website of Bayin'gholin (in Uyghur)

 
Autonomous prefectures of the People's Republic of China
Prefecture-level divisions of Xinjiang